Einzbern or von Einzbern is a surname can refer to the fictional Einzbern family or its members:

Illyasviel von Einzbern
Irisviel von Einzbern
Lizleihi Justica von Einzbern